The Condell class was the name given to a class of two new build and upgraded type s of the Chilean Navy, Almirante Condell and Almirante Lynch. They were ordered by the Chilean government in 1969 as ASW frigates. The ships were built between 1969 and 1973, under Chilean modifications, by Yarrow (Shipbuilders) Ltd. in Scotstoun, Glasgow. Almirante Condell arrived in Chile in 1973, with Almirante Lynch following in 1974.

 was decommissioned on 4 July 2007 after 33 years service.  was decommissioned on 18 April 2008, before both were sold to the Ecuadorian Navy on the same day.

See also
Chilean ship Almirante Condell, a list of ships with this name

References

Frigate classes
 
Chile–United Kingdom relations